Imposter is the third collaborative studio album by English singer-songwriter Dave Gahan and electronica producer Soulsavers. It was released on 12 November 2021 by Columbia Records. The album also produced one single.

Background
This is the Gahan's fifth studio album and Soulsavers' seventh. Imposter was recorded live in Malibu, California in November 2019, consisting of cover versions of various rock songs. Dave Gahan has said of the album: "When I listen to other people's voices and songs—more importantly the way they sing them and interpret the words—I feel at home. I identify with it. It comforts me more than anything else. There's not one performer on the record who I haven't been moved by."

Reception
At Metacritic, which assigns a normalized rating out of 100 to reviews from mainstream critics, the album received an average score of 67, based on six reviews, which indicates "generally favorable reviews". At AnyDecentMusic?, which collects critical reviews from more than 50 media sources, the album scored 6.6 points out of 10, based on seven reviews.

Ben Hogwood of musicOMH wrote, "In a wide range of interpretations, we are reminded of the extremes of this recognisable pop music voice, but are also given access to his vulnerable side. The singer himself will be 60 next year, and it is fascinating tracking the development of his voice over that time." Clash rated it 9 out of 10 and said that "an album that will become – in time – as significant and important to Gahan's career as Johnny Cash's ‘American’ series was to his enduring legacy." Neil Z. Yeung of AllMusic commented, "The resulting effort is mostly introspective, contemplative, and relaxing, but taken in another context, can be low energy and wearily sedate... While Imposter doesn't get the blood pumping as much as 2015's Angels & Ghosts, fans in need of a soundtrack for brooding will find this to be an ideal outlet." Lily Moayeri writing for Under the Radar mentioned, "In a way, the gravity and commitment to these appropriated songs makes them even more the property of Gahan & Soulsavers than their own original material. Be prepared for your heart to be wrenched out of your chest."

Track listing

Personnel
Band
Dave Gahan	– harmonica, vocals
Kevin Bales – drums, percussion
Travis Cole – vocals
Tony Foster – guitar, pedal steel
Ed Harcourt – piano
Martyn Lenoble	– bass (electric), bass (upright)
Rich Machin – guitar, synthesizer
Janet Ramus – vocals
Sean Read – organ, piano
Wendi Rose	– vocals
James Walbourne – guitar

Production
Geoff Pesche – mastering
Kaushlesh Garry Purohit – Engineer
Marta Salogni – mixing
Eric Weaver – engineer

Charts

References 

2021 albums
Dave Gahan albums
Soulsavers albums
Albums recorded at Shangri-La (recording studio)
Columbia Records albums
Covers albums